Beša may refer to several places in Slovakia.

Beša, Levice District
Beša, Michalovce District